Doller may mean:
 Doller (river)
 Doller (surname)
 Animegao, a Japanese form of costume dressing
 A misspelling of dollar